The 2009 BGL Luxembourg Open was a tennis tournament on indoor hard courts. It was the 14th edition of the Fortis Championships Luxembourg, and was part of the WTA International tournaments of the 2009 WTA Tour. It was held in Kockelscheuer, Luxembourg, from October 17 through October 25, 2009.

WTA entrants

Seeds

 seeds are based on the rankings of October 12, 2009

Other entrants
The following players received wildcards into the singles main draw:
  Kim Clijsters 
  Polona Hercog
  Mandy Minella

The following players received entry from the qualifying draw:
  Maria Elena Camerin
  Catalina Castaño
  Kirsten Flipkens
  Barbora Záhlavová-Strýcová

The following players received entry as a Lucky loser:
  Anne Kremer
  Aravane Rezaï

Champions

Singles

 Timea Bacsinszky def.  Sabine Lisicki, 6-2, 7-5
It was Bacsinszky's 1st title of the year and her career.

Doubles

 Iveta Benešová /  Barbora Záhlavová-Strýcová def.  Vladimíra Uhlířová /  Renata Voráčová, 1-6, 6-0, [10-7]

External links
Official website

2009 WTA Tour
2009
2009 in Luxembourgian tennis